Colin Holt may refer to:

 Colin Holt (footballer) (1934–2018), Australian rules footballer
 Colin Holt (activist) (1945–2006), former Chairman of the Yorkshire Ridings Society
 Colin Holt (politician) (born 1963), member of the Western Australian Legislative Council